The US Summer Tour was the debut promotional tour of American singer Whitney Houston, designed to promote her debut album Whitney Houston, released in February 1985. The tour took place in multiple theaters, festivals, and clubs around the United States throughout the summer and fall of 1985, between June 3 and December 1, 1985.

Background
Houston's debut album was released in early 1985 and she performed at various clubs to promote the album. Following the success of her first US #1 R&B single "You Give Good Love", Houston became the opening act for singers Luther Vandross and Jeffrey Osborne on their individual 1985 US tours. After the next single, "Saving All My Love For You" became Houston's first US #1 Pop single, she began headlining her own tour, playing at various American theaters, festivals, and clubs throughout the summer and fall of 1985.

Setlist
"Greatest Love of All"
"Love Will Find a Way"
"Someone for Me"
"You Give Good Love"
"All at Once"
"Thinking About You"
"Nobody Loves Me Like You Do" (duet with Gary Houston)
"How Will I Know"
"Saving All My Love for You"

Notes
Houston's set also included "I Am Changing" and "Home" which was often performed at select venues. 
August 28: in San Diego, Houston's opening act was comedian Roseanne Barr. 
October 26: Houston performed at Disney World's 'On Stage' event at the Skyleidsocope, on October 28: at Carnegie Hall, she performed "A Brand New Day" from the film The Wiz, after opening with "Greatest Love of All". She also performed "I Am Changing" from the broadway musical Dreamgirls.
November 20: at Carnegie Hall, Houston performed "I Am Changing", and closed show with the final encore, "Home" from the musical The Wiz.
November 24: in Houston, she performed "I Am Changing" and two additional duets with brother Gary Houston; "Hold Me" and "Take Good Care of My Heart".

Shows

Band
Music Director / Piano – John Simmons
Keyboards – Willard Meeks
Saxophone – Josh Harris
Guitar – Curtis Taylor Neishloss 
Drums – Brian Brake
Percussion – Kevin Jones
Background vocalists – Gary Houston, Felicia Moss, Voneva Simms

References 

1985 concert tours
Whitney Houston concert tours